Hog's pudding is a type of sausage produced in Cornwall and Devon. Popular variants of the recipe consist of pork meat and fat, suet, bread, as well as oatmeal or pearl barley formed into a large sausage—also known as 'groats pudding' and are very similar to a white pudding, whereas other versions of the recipe contain  a high percentage of offal such as lung and liver and can more accurately be described as a sort of West Country haggis. It is much spicier than white pudding as it contains black pepper, cumin, basil and garlic. The sausage is usually around two inches in diameter.

See also

Black pudding
Boudin
Faggot
Scrapple

References

Cornish cuisine
Devonshire cuisine
British sausages
Savory puddings